The Atelier Lacourière-Frélaut was a printer specializing in fine printmaking in Paris. In the 1930s the Atelier produced prints for Pablo Picasso and Henri Matisse.

It was founded by Roger Lacourière (1892-1966) in 1929. The establishment was taken over by Jacques Frélaut when Lacourière retired in 1957. 

In 1979 the Musée d'Art Moderne de Paris held the 50th anniversary retrospective "L'Atelier Lacourière-Frélaut ou 50 ans de gravures et d'impressions en taille-douce 1929-1979".

The Atelier closed in 2008.

References

French companies established in 1924
20th-century French printmakers